London Island is located west of Tierra del Fuego and it forms with the Península Brecknock the Paso Brecknock, the only passage between the Canal Ballenero and Canal Cockburn on the way from Beagle Channel to the Straits of Magellan and back.

See also
 List of islands of Chile

External links
 Islands of Chile @ United Nations Environment Programme
 World island information @ WorldIslandInfo.com
 South America Island High Points above 1000 meters
 United States Hydrographic Office, South America Pilot (1916)

Islands of Magallanes Region